El Salvador competed at the 2015 World Aquatics Championships in Kazan, Russia from 24 July to 9 August 2015.

Open water swimming

El Salvador has qualified one swimmer to compete in the open water marathon.

Swimming

Salvadoran swimmers have achieved qualifying standards in the following events (up to a maximum of 2 swimmers in each event at the A-standard entry time, and 1 at the B-standard):

Men

Women

References

External links
Kazan 2015 Official Site

Nations at the 2015 World Aquatics Championships
2015 in Salvadoran sport
El Salvador at the World Aquatics Championships